is a Japanese anime television series loosely based on the 2006 science fiction film Ultraviolet, written and directed by Kurt Wimmer.

The show was produced by the anime studio Madhouse and was directed by Osamu Dezaki. An English dub of the series, produced by Sony Pictures Television and Ocean Productions debuted on Crackle in April 2011. In 2012, it briefly aired on G4 in the United States and was later released in a manufacture on demand DVD set.  In 2018, the series was released by Mill Creek Entertainment along with Kurozuka and Viper's Creed as part of the Anime 3-Series Collection.

Plot
In the dystopian future of year 2140, 044 becomes the strongest female soldier excelling in combat through gene manipulation using the Hemophage Virus. However, in exchange for her abilities, her days become numbered. Her next mission from the government is to destroy a bloodthirsty group of people, the Phage, and its leader King. In her battle, she encounters a Phage soldier, Luka, and finds herself unable to kill him. She wonders why, but as a result, Daxus II, the leader of the government group, regards her as a traitor. She is targeted by both Phage and the government, as she flees with the injured Luka.

Characters

A clone specially engineered as a tool for humans to combat the Phages. At first, she is confused by the unfamiliarity of a life outside being ordered by the Central Government. Eventually, she becomes very contemplative of the fact there exists a world other than her own and escapes. Being a hunter of the Phage and after defying the orders of Daxus II, she becomes targeted by the two powerful forces. After rescuing Luka she is somehow compelled to save him. Later, together with Luka, she returns to Neo Tokyo to combat the Central Government's rule. She dies in the last episode when the building she was in is destroyed.

The most elite member of the Central Government's special agents, next to 044. He is also the leader of the SBCU (Special Battle-Clone Unit). Following 044's escape, he is sent by Daxus II to apprehend her. He is a rather cynical clone and hates the fact that 044's abilities had always been valued more his own. After relentlessly pursuing 044 throughout Neo Tokyo, they fight and he is killed.

The eccentric director of the Central Government who sees himself very highly and often berates his subordinates for their incompetence. He has known 044 since she was a little girl and at first, does not believe she could betray him. Soon after, enraged by her inconsideration of the care he had always administered to her, he ruthlessly tracks and pursues 044 throughout the galaxies. Later, it is revealed by King, that he too is a clone, for his father had contracted the Hemophage Virus and thus could not have sired him. He is killed by King in the last episode.

A doctor working for the Central Government as well as the guardian of 044. Giving up his position as a doctor, he accompanies her in her escape from the Central Government suggesting that he cares deeply for 044. He survives the entire way through the series.

The towering, aging leader of the Phage whose head is highly sought by the Central Government. He preaches to his fellow Phages of a world where they too, are not burdened by their disease and are able to live freely. He was one of the pioneers in establishing the Phage society along with Luka's father. He later dies at the hands of Daxus II but not without taking his life as well.

The son of a high-ranking member of the Phage society who, following his death, replaces his father as the deputy leader of the Neo Tokyo Phage forum. He is dedicated to fulfilling his father's role and has the utmost respect for King. He fights with and is rescued by 044; eventually he becomes inevitably involved with her. He is shot in the final episode and is thought to be dead until it is revealed that he is alive and will fully recover from his wound.

A kind doctor and a friend of Garcia from medical school. She owns a clinic in Neo Tokyo, which takes care of both human and Phage kind. She helps 044 and Luka by allowing them shelter at her clinic knowing that they were both being pursued by the government. She is with Garcia and Luka in the ending of the final episode on her private island.

An inspector of Neo Tokyo's public safety who is the first to encounter 044 following her escape with Luka. He is someone who is deeply concerned with the pride of his division and thus dies at the hands of the Central Government's elite agents for not complying with their demands.

Sakuza, also later revealed as clone 6030 is an enigmatic mine foreman in one of many Magnadite mines on the planet named the Coffin of Despair. Though appearing to be a very outgoing man, in the past he was one of the Central Government's forces during Bermuda's war of independence in the year 2122. Outraged by the government's orders which resulted in the vain deaths of his fellow clone soldiers, he single-handedly killed his commanding officers and fled. He is the last of his comrades from this war. He is killed personally by Daxus the second as he was trying to avenge his fallen clone brethren.

Episode list

Music
Opening theme
"Guilty Pleasure" by Becca
Ending theme
"Falling Down" by Becca

Also, most of the score that Klaus Badelt composed for the film were used as the score of the show.

References

External links
 
 

Animated television shows based on films
Animax original programming
Madhouse (company)
Science fiction anime and manga

ja:ウルトラヴァイオレット#テレビアニメ